Simón Rodríguez Susarte, commonly known as Simón Susarte, was a Spanish goatherd from Gibraltar, who in 1704 aided a Bourbon Spanish attempt to seize Gibraltar during the Twelfth Siege of Gibraltar by revealing a concealed path to the attackers which led to the top of the Rock of Gibraltar. Susarte then guided a Bourbon contingent along this difficult trail, aiming to surprise the Grand Alliance garrison in hopes of recovering the town.

The Gibraltar siege
Following the capture of Gibraltar by an Anglo-Dutch fleet on 4 August 1704 on behalf of the Grand Alliance, the Franco-Spanish Bourbon forces counterattacked by laying siege to the town in September, mainly attacking from the northern slopes of The Rock.

The path
On 8 October, Simón Susarte visited the Bourbon Spanish army camp on the north end of the isthmus to advise the troops of a path which led from the east side of Gibraltar's sheer rockface to its summit. This path was known to Susarte and other goatherds from Gibraltar, as they had used it regularly in search of pasture for their goats. The Marquis of Villadarias was in command at the camp; after confirming the veracity of Susarte's account, he decided to send a Colonel Figueroa together with 500 lightly armed grenadiers under Susarte to take the Alliance forces by surprise from the sheer rock face, in conjunction with a general attack to be launched by the remaining Spanish forces. On the night of 9 October, Figueroa's soldiers left the Bourbon lines and began climbing up the jagged eastern slopes of Gibraltar to the "Paso del Algarrobo". The troops spent the night on the east side of the Rock in Fig Tree Cave and Martin's Cave before ascending Middle Hill the next day.

The Grand Alliance counter-attack
Prince George of Hesse-Darmstadt had anticipated the possibility of an attack from the rear and had kept a mobile force in reserve to guard against such an eventuality. It was formed by an English company and two Spanish companies: a regular company under captain Francisco de Sandoval and a Catalan company of miquelets under Jaume Burguy, numbering 300 men, all of them led by Hesse's brother Heinrich. This reserve immediately responded and engaged the Spanish Bourbons at Middle Hill. Although the Bourbons had the advantage of height, they were trapped against the precipice they had climbed and only had three rounds of ammunition each, as a result of travelling light; they had not come prepared for a pitched battle.

The Spanish Habsburg force led by Captain Burguy, made up of miquelets and regulars, marched ahead and dislodged the Spanish Bourbon grenadiers from the top of the hill. At the same time, Sandoval, with his remaining regulars and miquelets, charged upon the bulk of the assaulting force from one flank, while Heinrich von Hesse attacked from the other side. Around a hundred of the Bourbon force, including their colonel, were captured. Hundreds more were killed, either by defending fire or by falling off the Rock while attempting to flee. Only a few, including Simón Susarte, made it back to the Bourbon lines. The English subsequently ensured that there would be no repeat of this episode by blasting away the path used by the Spanish.

Existence of Simón Susarte
There is doubt about the existence of Simón Susarte, since contemporary sources did not mention him at all and the first recorded mention dates to seventy eight years after the event. Susarte's story is first mentioned by Ignacio López de Ayala in his Historia de Gibraltar (History of Gibraltar), in 1782, and by Francisco María Montero in his Historia de Gibraltar y su Campo (History of Gibraltar and its Countryside), in 1860. However, the official accounts of the siege published in the Gaceta de Madrid or the letters of Villadarias (which generically talks about l'affaire de la montagne, the mountain affair) do not mention it. Sáez Rodríguez argues that the lack of any contemporary record of Susarte's involvement does not prove he did not exist but only that his alleged participation was hushed up.

A park in San Roque featuring Susarte's statue is named after him.

See also
 History of Gibraltar

References

Bibliography
 
 
 
 

Spanish people from Gibraltar
People of the Nine Years' War
Goatherds